Stefan Mitmasser (born 13 May 1995) is an Austrian footballer.

References

External links
 

1995 births
Living people
Austrian footballers
SV Horn players
Association football goalkeepers